Millicent Louisa Browne (25 December 1881 – 8 February 1975), later Millicent Price, was a British suffragette.

Life
Browne was born in London where her father was an actor. Her parents’ marriage ended and her mother took her to York.

Browne travelled around Britain giving talks in support of Women's suffrage. She was one of the helpers at the WSPU section in Bristol where she met Reginald Price. He was a Bristol University student who helped defend suffragettes when they were protesting.

Brown was invited to Emily Blathwayt's home at Batheaston where the leading suffragettes recouped. Significant visitors were asked to plant a tree to record their achievements on behalf of the cause e.g. a prison sentence. On 4 July 1909 Browne planted not a tree but a holly bush at Eagle House where Linley Blathwayt took her picture and recorded the planting. Most of the trees were destroyed in the 1960s but Brown's plaque is one of the few to have survived.

Browne wrote her autobiography in 1935 and this is held in archives in York.

References

1881 births
1975 deaths
People from Fulham
Eagle House suffragettes